Harold Francis Blum (1899 - 1980) was a physiologist who explored the interaction of light and chemicals on cells, especially sunlight-induced skin cancer.

Early life and education
Harold Blum was born on February 12, 1899, in Escondido, California. For a year during the First World War, he served with the American Expeditionary Forces Signal Corps in France. Blum graduated in 1922 from the University of California, Berkeley, with an A.B. in zoology with honors. He attended Harvard Medical School from 1923 to 1924, then returned to Berkeley for a Ph.D. in physiology and graduated in 1927. During his PhD studies Blum worked for the San Francisco Bay Marine Piling Committee. Blum completed postdoctoral studies at the Laboratoire Maritime de Concarneau in France and the University of Liège in Belgium in 1933.

Career
Harold Blum was an assistant professor of animal biology at the University of Oregon, then an instructor of physiology at Harvard Medical School. He became an assistant professor, then associate professor, of physiology at the University of California at Berkeley. In 1938, Blum was a founding member of the National Cancer Institute. Blum's 1940 book Photodynamic Action and Diseases Due to Light, written during the first of his three Guggenheim Fellowships (awarded in 1936, 1945, and 1953), was a classic text used in medical schools for many years. The book earned the Medal of the University of Liège. From 1943-1946 during the Second World War, he was a principal biophysicist of the Naval Medical Research Institute. In 1947 Blum became visiting professor at Princeton University, where he spent 20 years.

In 1951 Blum published Time's Arrow and Evolution, which "explores the relationship between time's arrow (the second law of thermodynamics) and organic evolution." This influential text studies "irreversibility and direction in evolution and order, negentropy, and evolution." Blum argues that evolution followed specific patterns predetermined by the inorganic nature of the earth and its thermodynamic processes. Scholar Robert Scholes, writing about influences on science fiction, calls the work a "milestone in science writing" that is "one of the finest pieces of science writing ever done."

Blum retired from Princeton University and the US Public Health Service in 1967. After retirement, he was a professor, then professor emeritus, of biology at State University of New York at Albany. From 1973 until his death in 1980, Harold Blum was visiting professor of photobiology at the Center for Photobiology, Skin and Cancer Hospital of the Temple University School of Medicine.

Harold Blum died in Philadelphia, Pennsylvania, on September 29, 1980.

References

American physiologists
UC Berkeley College of Letters and Science alumni
University of Oregon faculty
Harvard Medical School faculty
University of California, Berkeley faculty
Princeton University faculty
Temple University faculty
University at Albany, SUNY faculty
1899 births
1980 deaths
People from Escondido, California
United States Army personnel of World War I
Evolutionary biologists
Harvard Medical School alumni